Francesca is a genus of achilid planthoppers in the family Achilidae. There are at least two described species in Francesca.

Species
These two species belong to the genus Francesca:
 Francesca saleminophila Kirkaldy, 1906 c g
 Francesca sparsa Jacobi, 1928 c g
Data sources: i = ITIS, c = Catalogue of Life, g = GBIF, b = Bugguide.net

References

Further reading

 
 
 
 
 

Achilidae
Auchenorrhyncha genera